The 2013–14 Minnesota Wild season was the 14th season for the National Hockey League franchise that was established on June 25, 1997.

Standings

Schedule and results

Pre-season

Regular season

Playoffs

The Minnesota Wild entered the playoffs as the Western Conference's first wild card. They defeated the Central Division champion Colorado Avalanche in seven games in the first round, winning all three games at the Xcel Energy Center while losing the first three at the Pepsi Center until winning game seven there on a goal by Nino Niederreiter in overtime. The Wild fell to the Chicago Blackhawks in the second round, losing in game six on an overtime goal by Patrick Kane. It was the Wild's first (and only) loss at home of the 2014 post-season.

Player statistics
Final Stats 
Skaters

Goaltenders

†Denotes player spent time with another team before joining the Wild.  Stats reflect time with the Wild only.
‡Traded mid-season
Bold/italics denotes franchise record

Transactions
The Wild have been involved in the following transactions during the 2013–14 season.

Trades

Free agents signed

Free agents lost

Claimed via waivers

Lost via waivers

Player signings

Draft picks

Minnesota Wild's picks at the 2013 NHL Entry Draft, to be held in Newark, New Jersey on June 30, 2013.

Draft notes

 The Minnesota Wild's first-round pick went to the Buffalo Sabres as the result of an April 3, 2013 trade that sent Jason Pominville and a 2014 fourth-round pick to the Wild in exchange for Johan Larsson, Matt Hackett, a 2014 second-round pick and this pick.
 The New Jersey Devils' third-round pick went to the New York Islanders as the result of a trade on June 30, 2013 that sent Nino Niederreiter to Minnesota in exchange for Cal Clutterbuck and this pick.     Minnesota previously acquired this pick as the result of a trade on February 24, 2012 that sent Marek Zidlicky to New Jersey in exchange for Kurtis Foster, Nick Palmieri, Stephane Veilleux, Washington's second-round pick in 2012 and this pick (being conditional at the time of the trade). The conditions – New Jersey make the Eastern Conference Finals of the 2012 Stanley Cup playoffs, Zidlicky plays in 75 percent of New Jersey's games in the first two rounds – were converted on May 9. 2012.
 The Minnesota Wild's third-round pick went to the Pittsburgh Penguins (via Philadelphia and Dallas), the Wild traded this pick to the Philadelphia Flyers as the result of a June 27, 2011 trade that sent Darroll Powe to the Wild in exchange for this pick.
 The San Jose Sharks' third-round pick went to the Minnesota Wild as a result of an August 7, 2011 trade that sent James Sheppard to the Sharks in exchange for this pick.
 The New York Rangers' seventh-round pick went to the Minnesota Wild as a result of a February 3, 2012 trade that sent Casey Wellman to the Rangers in exchange for Erik Christensen and this pick.

References

Minnesota Wild seasons
Minnesota Wild season, 2013-14
Minn